PDFedit is a free PDF editor for Unix-like operating systems (including Cygwin on top of Windows). It does not support editing protected or encrypted PDF files or word processor-style text manipulation, however.

PDFedit GUI is based on the Qt 3 toolkit and scripting engine (QSA), so every operation is scriptable. It also has the ability to be scripted in ECMAScript. Part of the program is also command line interface for PDF manipulation. Xpdf is used for low level processing.

PDF is a complex format designed for publishing output, not for any further modifications.  PDFedit is a low-level tool for technical users that provides structured access to the internal structure of the PDF file. It may require familiarity with PDF specifications to be able to make substantial modifications.

See also
List of PDF software

References

External links

PDFedit on SourceForge
PDFedit Wiki
PDFedit Website
Modifying PDF Files With PDFedit On Ubuntu

Free PDF software
PDF readers
Software that uses Qt
Technical communication tools
X Window programs